The Lady's Not For Sale is a 1972 album by Rita Coolidge, and was released on the A&M Records label, AMLH 64370. It was later reissued on the Music For Pleasure label, MFP-50500. The inner gatefold photo was shot on location by Terry Paul (Kris Kristofferson’s bass player) at Stonehenge in the English county of Wiltshire.

Track listing

Side one
"My Crew" (Priscilla Jones, Booker T. Jones) – 4:53
"Fever" (Johnny Davenport, Eddie Cooley) – 3:28
"Bird on a Wire" (Leonard Cohen) – 5:39
"I'll Be Your Baby Tonight" (Bob Dylan) – 3:15
"A Woman Left Lonely" (Spooner Oldham, Dan Penn) – 5:05

Side two
"Whiskey Whiskey" (Tom Ghent) – 4:00
"Everybody Loves a Winner" (William Bell, Booker T. Jones) – 4:04
"Donut Man" (Marc Benno, Irwin Benno) – 3:25
"Inside of Me" (Marc Benno, Irwin Benno, Michael Utley) – 6:35
"The Lady's Not for Sale" (Kris Kristofferson, Carol Pugh) – 4:10

Personnel
Rita Coolidge - vocals
Marc Benno, Bernie Leadon, Charlie Freeman - guitar
Al Perkins - rhythm guitar, pedal steel, National slide guitar
Al Kooper - lead guitar on "The Lady's Not for Sale"
Jerry McGee - acoustic guitar on "My Crew"
Sneaky Pete Kleinow - steel guitar on "A Woman Left Lonely" and "Donut Man"
Carl Radle, Lee Sklar, Tommy McClure - bass
Michael Utley - keyboards
Jim Keltner, Russell Kunkel, Sammy Creason - drums
Booker T. Jones - flute, backing vocals
John Sebastian - harmonica on "I'll Be Your Baby Tonight"
Donna Weiss, Priscilla Jones, Maxine Willard Waters, Sherlie Matthews, Venetta Fields - backing vocals
Kris Kristofferson - backing vocals and arrangement on "Whiskey, Whiskey" 
Technical
Front & Back Cover Photography - Bob Jenkins
Inside Photograph - Terry Paul
Art Direction - Roland Young
Album Design - Chuck Beeson
Recording Engineers: Glyn Johns, John Haeny, Richard Moore
Re-mix Engineer, David Anderle

"The producer of this album would especially like to thank Marc Benno and Kris Kristofferson for their inspiration."

Charts

References

Rita Coolidge albums
1972 albums
A&M Records albums
Albums produced by David Anderle
Albums recorded at Wally Heider Studios
Albums recorded at Sunset Sound Recorders